Emotional Education is the debut full-length album by English singer-songwriter duo Ider, released on 19 July 2019 through Glassnote Records. Emotional Education follows the 2017 release of the band's debut EP, Gut Me Like an Animal. The record, classified by Metacritic as pop rock, alternative rock and indie, was described by music critics as an exploration of "mid-20s melancholy".

Background
Ider's most major release to Emotional Education was their 2017 EP Gut Me Like An Animal, their only release through Aesop. The same year, they signed to Glassnote Records.

The album's title comes from a lyric in its tenth track, "Saddest Generation": "One in four/one in four/where is the emotional education/we're all looking for?"

Singles
The first single from the album, "Body Love", was released on 3 November 2017. "Body Love (HOAX Remix) was released on 3 October 2018.

The second single, "You've Got Your Whole Life Ahead of You Baby", was released on 27 July 2018.

The third single from the album, "Mirror", was released on 18 October 2018. "Mirror (Honors Remix)" was released on 30 November 2018, and "Mirror (12welve remix)" was released on 11 January 2019.

The fourth single, "Brown Sugar", was released on 2 February 2019.

Track listing

Critical reception

At Metacritic, which assigns a normalised rating out of 100 to reviews from mainstream critics, the album has an average score of 81, based on 6 reviews, indicating "universal acclaim". Pip Williams, writing for The Line of Best Fit, said that the album is "coherent despite a refusal to adhere to genre-based constraints, Emotional Education is heartbreaking yet hopeful, relatable yet precise." Kitty Empire for The Observer said that "these 11 songs ping confidently around the post-genre electro-pop landscape."

Narzra Ahmed of Clash described Emotional Education as "a very enjoyable, incomparable album, with moments of extraordinary depth." Writing in The Guardian, Michael Hann wrote that the album "is full of good melodies and millennial anxiety. It just needs the grain of sand that makes the pearl."

References

2019 debut albums
Glassnote Records albums
Ider (band) albums